Scaphander lignarius, common name the woody canoe-bubble,  is a species of sea snail, a bubble snail, a marine opisthobranch gastropod mollusk in the family Scaphandridae, the canoe-bubbles.

Distribution
This species is found in European waters and in the Mediterranean Sea.

References

 Gofas, S.; Le Renard, J.; Bouchet, P. (2001). Mollusca, in: Costello, M.J. et al. (Ed.) (2001). European register of marine species: a check-list of the marine species in Europe and a bibliography of guides to their identification. Collection Patrimoines Naturels, 50: pp. 180–213
 Muller, Y. (2004). Faune et flore du littoral du Nord, du Pas-de-Calais et de la Belgique: inventaire. [Coastal fauna and flora of the Nord, Pas-de-Calais and Belgium: inventory]. Commission Régionale de Biologie Région Nord Pas-de-Calais: France. 307 pp

External links 

Scaphandridae
Gastropods described in 1767
Taxa named by Carl Linnaeus